Eduardo Bello (born 27 November 1995) is an Argentine rugby union footballer. His playing position is Prop. He currently plays for Saracens.

Bello played for Italian team Zebre from 2018 to 2022.
On June 9 2022 it was announced that Bello would be signing for Gallagher Premiership team Saracens ahead of the 2022/23 season. 

After playing for Argentina Under 20 in 2015, from 2016 to 2017 Bello was named in the Argentina XV. In September 2021 he was named in Argentina squad for 2021 Rugby Championship. He made his debut in Round 6 of the 2021 Rugby Championship against Australia.

References

External links
ESPN Profile
It's Rugby France Profile

1995 births
Living people
Argentine rugby union players
Argentina international rugby union players
Rugby union props
Zebre Parma players
Sportspeople from Córdoba, Argentina